Flabellipecten is a genus of large scallops or saltwater clams, marine bivalve mollusks in the family Pectinidae, the scallops.

Genera
 Flabellipecten antiguensis † Brown 1913
 Flabellipecten beali † Hertlein 1925
 Flabellipecten bosei † Hanna and Hertlein 1927
 Flabellipecten carrizoensis † Arnold 1906
 Flabellipecten duplex † Cooke 1919
 Flabellipecten duwelzi † Nyst 1861
 Flabellipecten edegemensis Glibert, 1945)
 Flabellipecten flabelliformis † (Brocchi, 1814)
 Flabellipecten fraterculus † Sowerby in Smith 1841
 Flabellipecten incrassatus
 Flabellipecten leythajanus
 Flabellipecten nigromagnus
 Flabellipecten oblongus † Philippi 1893
 Flabellipecten pyramidesensis † Ihering 1907
 Flabellipecten refugioensis † Hertlein 1925
 Flabellipecten sericeus Hinds 1844
 Flabellipecten ugolinii † Daperet and Roam 1910
 Flabellipecten sendanensis † Martin 1909

References
Sepkoski's Online Genus Database
Paleobiology Database
Encyclopaedia of Life
Zipcodezoo
Universal Biological Indexer

Pectinidae
Bivalve genera